Extortion is the act of obtaining benefit through coercion.

It can also refer to:

Extortion (band), a hardcore punk band from Perth, Western Australia
Extortion (film), an action film directed by Phil Volken